Yun Seog-won (born 10 January 1934) is a South Korean weightlifter. He competed in the men's middle heavyweight event at the 1968 Summer Olympics.

References

1934 births
Living people
South Korean male weightlifters
Olympic weightlifters of South Korea
Weightlifters at the 1968 Summer Olympics
Asian Games medalists in weightlifting
Asian Games gold medalists for South Korea
Asian Games silver medalists for South Korea
Asian Games bronze medalists for South Korea
Weightlifters at the 1970 Asian Games
Weightlifters at the 1974 Asian Games
Medalists at the 1970 Asian Games
Medalists at the 1974 Asian Games
20th-century South Korean people
21st-century South Korean people